"Burn Radio Burn" is a song by American rapper MC Ren. It was released for digital download on December 29, 2014, as the second single from his upcoming EP Rebel Music. The song was produced by E-A-Ski and features Redd Tha Rsonist.

Track listing
 Digital download

Remix
The official remix featuring Public Enemy rapper Chuck D is expected to be released on the future.

References 

Songs written by MC Ren
2014 singles
2014 songs
MC Ren songs
Songs about radio